Andy Warhol (1928–1987) was an American artist, film director, and producer.

Warhol may also refer to:

Warhol (book), a 2020 biography of Andy Warhol written by Blake Gopnik
Warhol (crater), a crater on Mercury
Warhol (unit), a humorous unit of measurement of fame or hype
Warhol, a musical alias of Canadian-American hip hop artist Noah23
"Warhol", a song by Linea 77 from the 2003 album Numb
"Warhol", a song by Palaye Royale from the 2016 album Boom Boom Room (Side A)
"Warhol", a song by Lisa Mitchell from the 2016 album Warriors

See also
 
 
 Andy Warhol (disambiguation)
 Warhola